The following are the football (soccer) events of the year 1935 throughout the world.

Events
 15 November – Honduran club C.D. Victoria is established.

Winners club national championship 

 Argentina: Boca Juniors
 England: Arsenal F.C.
 France: FC Sochaux-Montbéliard
 Hungary: Újpest FC
 Italy: Juventus
 Netherlands: PSV Eindhoven
 Poland: Ruch Chorzów
 Romania: Ripensia Timișoara
 Scotland: 
Division One: Rangers F.C.
Scottish Cup: Rangers F.C.
 Soviet Union: team of Moscow
 Spain: Real Betis
 Turkey: Fenerbahçe

International tournaments
1935 British Home Championship (September 29, 1934 – April 6, 1935)
Shared by  & 

 III. Dr. Gerö Cup

Births
 January 3: Alfredo del Águila, Mexican footballer (died 2018)
 January 11: Piero Betello, Italian professional footballer
 January 17: Albert Cheesebrough, English club footballer (died 2020)
 February 4: Horacio Troche, Uruguayan international footballer (died 2014)
 April 12: Heinz Schneiter, Swiss international footballer and manager (died 2017)
 June 24: Juan Bautista Agüero, Paraguayan football striker (died 2018)
 June 26: Bogdan Dochev, Bulgarian football referee (died 2017)
 July 3: Osvaldo Bagnoli, Italian football coach and player
 July 12: Hans Tilkowski, German international footballer and coach (died 2020)
 July 18: Vasile Alexandru, Romanian footballer
 July 20: Valér Švec, Slovak football player and coach
 July 24: Giuseppe Virgili, Italian international footballer (died 2016)
 July 27:
 Mihalj Mesaroš, Yugoslav/Serbian footballer (died 2017)
 Billy McCullough, Northern Irish footballer
 July 28: Leif Skiöld, Swedish international footballer and ice hockey player (died 2014)
 August 4: Hans-Walter Eigenbrodt, German football player (died 1997)
 August 8: Mário Coluna, Portuguese international footballer and manager (died 2014)
 August 25: José Ramos Delgado, Argentine footballer and manager (died 2010)
 September 5: Alfred Schmidt, German international footballer and manager (died 2016)
 September 7: Pedro Manfredini, Argentine footballer (died 2019)
 September 11: Károly Palotai, Hungarian football player (died 2018)
 October 1: Peter Velappan, Malaysian football administrator and manager (died 2018)
 December 23: Abdul Ghani Minhat, Malaysian footballer (died 2012)
 December 26: Stevie Chalmers, Scottish international footballer (died 2019)

Deaths

References

 
Association football by year